The swift fruit bat (Thoopterus nigrescens) is a species of megabat in the family Pteropodidae.

References

Megabats
Endemic fauna of Indonesia
Bats of Indonesia
Mammals of Sulawesi
Mammals described in 1870
Taxonomy articles created by Polbot
Taxa named by John Edward Gray